The Hofmillerstraße, named after the critic and translator, Josef Hofmiller (1872–1933), is a street in the Munich district of Obermenzing, which was built around 1897.

History 
The street, originally called IV. Apfelallee, is a west-east oriented street of the Villenkolonie Pasing II, which connects the Alte Allee with the Marschnerstraße. The Hofmillerstraße, until the First World War, was first built up with a loose construction of single-family houses. In the last decades, the vacant lots have been built up with blocks of flats.

In the spring of 2016 the road received a new bitumen cover.

Historical buildings 

 Hofmillerstraße 4 (Villa)
 Hofmillerstraße 11 (Villa)
 Hofmillerstraße 26 (Villa)
 Hofmillerstraße 30 (Villa)
 Hofmillerstraße 32 (Villa)
 Hofmillerstraße 34 (Villa)

Literature 

 Dennis A. Chevalley, Timm Weski: Landeshauptstadt München – Südwest (= Bavarian State Office for Monument Protection [ed.]: Denkmäler in Bayern. Vol. I.2/2). Karl M. Lipp Verlag, Munich 2004, p. 304.

Streets in Munich
Buildings and structures in Munich
Pasing-Obermenzing